Flux is a rate of flow through a surface or substance in physics, and has a related meaning in applied mathematics.

Flux may also refer to:

Science and technology

Biology and healthcare
 Flux (biology), movement of a substance between compartments
 Flux (metabolism), the rate of turnover of molecules through a metabolic pathway
 4-Fluoroamphetamine (4-FA; PAL-303; "Flux"), a central nervous system stimulant with quasi-amphetamine effects
 Dysentery, or other diseases called "flux", which cause the loss of fluid by diarrhea or hemorrhage
 Rheumatism (historically), or "flux", thought to be caused by an excessive flow of rheum or fluid into a joint
 Slime flux, a bacterial disease that occurs on certain trees

Computing
 Flux (software), a suite of VRML/X3D viewing/authoring software
 Flux (software company), a developer of workflow software
 f.lux, a program that adjusts the color temperature of a computer display
 Fast flux, a DNS technique used by botnets to hide phishing and malware delivery sites

Physics and engineering
 Flux (metallurgy), a chemical cleaning agent, flowing agent, or purifying agent enhancing success in soldering and like joining of metals
 Ceramic flux, a substance which lowers the melting point and promotes glass formation in ceramic materials and glasses
 Secondary flux, a substance which acts as a ceramic flux in combination with other materials or at higher temperatures
 Electric flux, a measure of quantity of electricity
 Luminous flux, in photometry
 Magnetic flux, a measure of quantity of magnetism
 Radiant flux, in radiometry

People with the name
 Alfred William Flux (1867–1942), British economist and statistician
 Robert Flux, guitarist of the band Oomph!
 Maarten van der Vleuten (born 1967), Dutch composer and producer, alias Flux

Art and entertainment

Fictional characters
 Flux (comics), a Marvel Comics antagonist opposing the Hulk
 Flux (Dennis Sykes), a character in the Marvel Comics series 1 Month 2 Live
 Flux Wildly, a character in the computer game Toonstruck

Literature
 Flux (novel), a book by Stephen Baxter
 "Flux", a short story by Michael Moorcock

Music
 Flux (Caveman Shoestore album), 1994
 Flux (Poppy album), 2021
 Flux (Rich Robinson album), 2016
 Flux, an album by Love Spirals Downwards, 1998
 "Flux" (Bloc Party song), 2007
 "Flux" (Ellie Goulding song), 2019
 "Flux", a song by Lamb of God from New American Gospel, 2000

Other uses in art and entertainment
 Flux (magazine), a music, comic book and video game magazine of the 1990s
 MTV Flux, a former television channel in the United Kingdom and Japan
 Doctor Who: Flux, the thirteenth series of the British science fiction television programme

Organizations
 Flux (political party), a political party in Australia
 The Flux Foundation, an arts non-profit group

Other uses
 Flux, Utah, a ghost town and former mining community in Tooele County, Utah
 Flow (psychology), often referred to as flux
 "Flux", the imagery of the River in the fragments of the presocratic philosopher Heraclitus

See also
 Fluxus, an art movement
 Fluxx, a card game